Donald McGillivray may refer to:
 Donald McGillivray (botanist) (1935–2012), Australian botanical taxonomist
 Donald McGillivray (politician) (1838–1913), politician in British Columbia
 Don McGillvray investigative award, see Connie Walker

See also
 Donald MacGillivray, Scottish colonial administrator